Bostrichus is a genus of beetles found in the Palearctic (including Europe), the Near East, and North Africa.

External links
Bostrichus at Fauna Europaea

Bostrichidae